Aleksandr Sergeyevich Roldugin (born 6 June 1990) is a former Russian professional football player.

Club career
He played one season in the Russian Football National League for FC Metallurg Lipetsk.

External links
 
 

1990 births
People from Lipetsk Oblast
Living people
Russian footballers
Association football midfielders
FC Metallurg Lipetsk players
FC Spartak Tambov players
FC Oryol players
Sportspeople from Lipetsk Oblast